Our Man in Casablanca (also known as The Killer Lacks a Name) is a 1966 Spanish-Italian Eurospy film written and directed by Tulio Demicheli and starring  Lang Jeffries.

Cast  
  Lang Jeffries as  Brian Kervin
   Olga Omar as Nadia Nalis
  Thea Fleming as Ingrid van Heufen
   Barbara Nelli as Zara Abbas
  Pier Paolo Capponi as Hermann von Heufen
  Rubén Rojo as Shannon
   Paco Morán  as Draco
  José María Caffarel as Ali Ahmed
  Sara Guasch as Azina Nalis

References

External links

Spanish spy thriller films
Italian spy thriller films
1960s spy thriller films
Films directed by Tulio Demicheli
Films set in Morocco
Films scored by Giovanni Fusco
1960s Italian films
1960s Spanish films